The 2012 Blancpain Endurance Series season was the second season of the Blancpain Endurance Series. The season featured six rounds lasting three hours each, starting on 14 April at Monza and ended in October at Navarra. An improved support package was added with the British Formula 3 Championship and Blancpain Revival Series was present at selected rounds and the Lamborghini Blancpain Super Trofeo was present at all events.

Calendar
On 9 December 2011, the Stéphane Ratel Organisation announced the 2012 calendar.

Entry list
On 17 February, SRO released the provisional entry list for the first round at Monza. This was updated on 10 March.

Results

Championship standings

Drivers' Championships

Teams' Championships

References

External links

2012 in motorsport
2012 in European sport
2012